West Brit, an abbreviation of West Briton, is a derogatory term for an Irish person who is perceived as Anglophilic in matters of culture or politics. West Britain is a description of Ireland emphasising it as under British influence.

History
"West Britain" was used with reference to the Acts of Union 1800 which united the Kingdom of Great Britain and the Kingdom of Ireland into the United Kingdom of Great Britain and Ireland. Similarly "North Britain" for Scotland used after the 1603 Union of the Crowns and the Acts of Union 1707 connected it to the Kingdom of England ("South Britain"). In 1800 Thomas Grady, a Limerick unionist, published a collection of light verse called The West Briton, while an anti-union cartoon depicted an official offering bribes and proclaiming "God save the King & his Majesty's subjects of west Britain that is to be!" In 1801 the Latin description of George III on the Great Seal of the Realm was changed from  "King of Great Britain, France and Ireland" to  "King of the Britains", dropping the claim to the French throne and describing Great Britain and Ireland as "the Britains".

Irish unionist MP Thomas Spring Rice (later Lord Monteagle of Brandon) said on 23 April 1834 in the House of Commons in opposing Daniel O'Connell's motion for Repeal of the Union, "I should prefer the name of West Britain to that of Ireland". Rice was derided by Henry Grattan later in the same debate: "He tells us, that he belongs to England, and designates himself as a West Briton." Daniel O'Connell himself used the phrase at a pro-Repeal speech in Dublin in February 1836:

Here, O'Connell was hoping that Ireland would soon become as prosperous as "North Britain" had become after 1707, but if the Union did not deliver this, then some form of Irish home rule was essential. The Dublin administration as conducted in the 1830s was, by implication, an unsatisfactory halfway house between these two ideals, and as a prosperous "West Britain" was unlikely, home rule was the rational best outcome for Ireland.

"West Briton" next came to prominence in a pejorative sense during the land struggle of the 1880s. D. P. Moran, who founded The Leader in 1900, used the term frequently to describe those who he did not consider sufficiently Irish. It was synonymous with those he described as "Sourfaces", who had mourned the death of the Queen Victoria in 1901. It included virtually all Church of Ireland Protestants and those Catholics who did not measure up to his definition of "Irish Irelanders".

In 1907, Canon R. S. Ross-Lewin published a collection of loyal Irish poems under the pseudonym "A County of Clare West Briton", explaining the epithet in the foreword:

Ernest Augustus Boyd's 1924 collection Portraits: real and imaginary included "A West Briton", which gave a table of West-Briton responses to keywords:
{|
|-
! Word !! Response
|-
|  Sinn Féin   ||  Pro-German
|-
|   Irish  ||   Vulgar
|-
|  England   ||   Mother-country
|-
|  Green   ||   Red
|-
|  Nationality   ||   Disloyalty
|-
|  Patriotism   ||  O.B.E.
|-
| Self-determination || Czecho-Slovakia
|}
According to Boyd, "The West Briton is the near Englishman ... an unfriendly caricature, the reductio ad absurdum of the least attractive English characteristics. ... The best that can be said ... is that the species is slowly becoming extinct. ... nationalism has become respectable". The opposite of the "West Briton" Boyd called the "synthetic Gael".

After the independence of the Irish Free State, "West British" was applied mainly to anglophile Roman Catholics, the small number of Catholic unionists, as Protestants were expected to be naturally unionists. This was not automatic, since there were, and are, also Anglo-Irish Protestants favouring Irish republicanism (see Protestant Irish nationalism).

Contemporary usage
"Brit" meaning "British person", attested in 1884, is pejorative in Irish usage, though used as a value-neutral colloquialism in Great Britain. During the Troubles, among nationalists "the Brits" specifically meant the British Army in Northern Ireland.  "West Brit" is today used by Irish people, chiefly within Ireland, to criticise a variety of perceived faults of other Irish people:
 "Revisionism" (compare historical revisionism and historical negationism): 
 Criticism of historical Irish uprisings. (State policy is to praise the patriotism of rebels up to the revolutionary period, while condemning later physical force republicans as antidemocratic.) 
 highlighting perceived benefits of British rule in Ireland
 downplaying British actions during historical events in Ireland such as the Great Famine
 Antipathy to Irish rebel songs.
 Anglophilia: following British popular culture; admiration for the British royal family; support for the Republic of Ireland rejoining the Commonwealth of Nations or becoming a Commonwealth Realm; highlighting positive British influence in the world, past or present
 Cultural cringe: appearing embarrassed by or disdainful of aspects of Irish culture, such as the Irish language, Hiberno-English, Gaelic games, or Irish traditional music
 Partitionism: Opposition or indifference to a United Ireland; showing political support for neo-unionism 
Not all people so labelled may actually be characterised by these stereotypical views and habits.

Public perception and self-identity can vary.  During his 2011 presidential campaign, Sinn Féin candidate Martin McGuinness criticised what he called West Brit elements of the media, who he said were out to undermine his attempt to win the election. He later said it was an "off-the-cuff remark" but did not define for the electorate what (or who) he had meant by the term.

Irish entertainer Terry Wogan, who spent most of his career working for the BBC in Britain, described himself as a West Brit: "I'm an effete, urban Irishman. I was an avid radio listener as a boy, but it was the BBC, not RTÉ. I was a West Brit from the start. [...] I'm a kind of child of the Pale. I think I was born to succeed here [in the UK]; I have much more freedom than I had in Ireland." He became a dual citizen of Ireland and the UK and was eventually knighted by Queen Elizabeth II.

The Irish Times columnist Donald Clarke noted a number of things that may prompt the application of a West Brit label, including being from Dublin (or south Dublin), supporting UK-based football teams, using the phrase "Boxing Day", or voting for Fine Gael.

Similar terms
Castle Catholic was applied more specifically by Republicans to middle-class Catholics assimilated into the pro-British establishment, after Dublin Castle, the centre of the British administration. Sometimes the exaggerated pronunciation spelling Cawtholic was used to suggest an accent imitative of British Received Pronunciation.

These identified Catholic unionists whose involvement in the British system was the whole aim of O'Connell's Emancipation Act of 1829. Having and exercising their new legal rights under the Act, Castle Catholics were then rather illogically being pilloried by other Catholics for exercising them to the full.

The old-fashioned word shoneen (from Irish: Seoinín, diminutive of Seán, thus literally 'Little John', and apparently a reference to John Bull) was applied to those who emulated the homes, habits, lifestyle, pastimes, clothes, and zeitgeist of the Protestant Ascendancy. P. W. Joyce's English As We Speak It in Ireland defines it as "a gentleman in a small way: a would-be gentleman who puts on superior airs."   A variant since c. 1840, jackeen ('Little Jack'), was used in the countryside in reference to Dubliners with British sympathies; it is a pun, substituting the nickname Jack for John, as a reference to the Union Jack, the British flag. In the 20th century, jackeen took on the more generalized meaning of "a self-assertive worthless fellow".

Antonyms
The term is sometimes contrasted with Little Irelander, a derogatory term for an Irish person who is seen as excessively nationalistic, Anglophobic and xenophobic, sometimes also practising a strongly conservative form of Roman Catholicism. This term was popularised by Seán Ó Faoláin. "Little Englander" had been an equivalent term in British politics since about 1859.

An antonym of jackeen, in its modern sense of an urban (and strongly British-influenced) Dubliner, is culchie, referring to an unsophisticated Irish person who resides in the countryside.

See also

Plastic Paddy
More Irish than the Irish themselves
Pom or pommy

References

Pejorative terms for European people
Anti-British sentiment
Foreign relations of Ireland
Politics of Ireland
Irish slang
Ireland–United Kingdom relations